Ido Kozikaro (עידו קוז'יקרו; originally Cojocaru) (born January 8, 1978) is an Israeli 2.03 m (6 ft 8 in) tall center former basketball player. He is mostly known for his tenure playing for Maccabi Haifa BC. In 2002-03 he was the top rebounder in the Israel Basketball Premier League.

Professional career
Kozikaro made his debut with Hapoel Galil Elyon in 1996–97, and played with the team through its 2002–03 championship season. In 2002-03 he was the top rebounder in the Israel Basketball Premier League.  He played for Hapoel Jerusalem from 2003–04 through its 2005–07 championship season.  

He played for Hapoel Ironi Nahariya in 2006–07 and its 2007–08 championship season.  Kozikaro played for Maccabi Haifa from 2008–09 through its 2009–10 championship season.  He signed with Hapoel Gilboa Galil Elion for the 2010–11 season.

Israeli national team

He was a member of the Israeli U-22 National Team at the 1998 European U-22 Championship. He was a member of the Israeli National Team at the 2001, 2003, 2005, 2007, and 2009 European Championships.

References

External links
 Israeli League profile
 Euroleague.net Profile

1978 births
Living people
Centers (basketball)
Hapoel Galil Elyon players
Hapoel Gilboa Galil Elyon players
Hapoel Jerusalem B.C. players
Ironi Nahariya players
Israeli Basketball Premier League players
Israeli men's basketball players
Israeli people of Romanian-Jewish descent
Maccabi Haifa B.C. players
People from Kiryat Shmona
Survivor (Israeli TV series) contestants